The Bideford Railway Heritage Centre CIC (previously the Bideford and Instow Railway Group) in Devon, England, is responsible for the management of the Bideford station site.
The company is also responsible for Instow signal box which opens on occasional Sundays and bank holidays from Easter to October.

History

The line was opened from Barnstaple to Fremington in 1848. Passenger trains ran throughout from Barnstaple railway station to Bideford from 2 November 1855 as the Bideford Extension Railway. The line was further extended to Torrington in 1872 when the current Bideford railway station was opened.

Passenger services ceased on 2 October 1965 although ball clay traffic continued until 1982. The track was removed in 1985 after some interest by BR in reintroducing a passenger service to Bideford. The trackbed was later converted into the Tarka Trail, a walkway using the formation between Petrockstow (later the terminus of services after the line was truncated in the 1960s) and Barnstaple Junction.

In 2009, James May attempted to reconnect the former Bideford station with Barnstaple Junction using an OO scale model train as part of James May's Toy Stories. Unfortunately, the last train - a Hornby Class 395 "Javelin", and the prototype model for the production models - burnt out at Instow at 12:18am the day after the trains left Barnstaple.
The first train to arrive at Bideford was a Hornby Intercity 125, followed by a hydrogen-powered train and finally, May's own model of LNER 'Pacific' 4472 Flying Scotsman.

Visitor attractions

The Bideford Railway Heritage Centre has developed the site since 1989 to ensure a preservation presence at the old Bideford station. A replica of the original signal box was built in 1992 and signal levers were installed later.  An interactive interpretation centre was opened in the green PMV (Parcels and Miscellaneous Van) in 2019. Short passenger rides are given at Bideford on dates announced on the website www.bidefordrailway.co.uk, using the Planet diesel locomotive. The site has been fully renovated and is open from Easter to the end of October at weekends and school holidays. A cafe in the Mark 1 coach at these times for walkers and cyclists on the Tarka Trail. The site is accessible from the Tarka Trail even when the station site is not open.

Rolling stock
The Railway has the following items of rolling stock.
Hibberd Planet diesel locomotive No.3832, operational. 
BR Mk1 TSO 4489, Used as a cafe and is painted in BR Green.
SR PMV 2142, Holds the Interactive Interpretation Centre.
BR Toadfit brake van Under overhaul.

See also
Other local railway attractions:
Lynton and Barnstaple Railway
Lynton and Lynmouth Cliff Railway
Dartmoor Railway

References

External links
Bideford Railway Heritage Centre Website
Bideford Railway Museum – Information from Devon County Council
 Entry at Information Britain
 Video footage of the museum

Railway museums in England
Heritage railways in Devon
Museums in Devon
Bideford
Buildings and structures in Bideford